The Arrëza oil field is an Albanian oil field that was discovered in 1975. It is near the village Arrëz, west of the town Kuçovë. It is one of the biggest on-shore oil field of Albania. It began production in 1976 and produces oil.

See also

Oil fields of Albania

References

Oil fields of Albania
Dimal, Albania